Samy Faraj (born 4 October 2001) is a professional footballer who plays as a midfielder for  club Paris 13 Atletico on loan from Sochaux. Born in France, Faraj represents Algeria internationally, after previously representing Morocco.

Club career
Faraj is a youth product of Lille since he was nine, and moved to Sochaux in 2018. Faraj made his professional debut with Sochaux in a 1-1 Ligue 2 tie with Rodez AF on 19 September 2020. 

On 7 January 2023, Faraj was loaned to Paris 13 Atletico in Championnat National.

International career
Faraj was born in France to a Moroccan father and Algerian mother. He represented the Morocco U16s at the 2017 Montaigu Tournament. 

In December 2020, Faraj announced in an interview that he had chosen to play for Algeria. A few days later, Faraj was called up by the Algeria under-20 national team for the 2020 UNAF U-20 Tournament in Tunisia.

Personal life
Faraj is the younger brother of the French youth international footballer Imad Faraj.

References

External links
 

2001 births
People from Croix, Nord
Sportspeople from Nord (French department)
Footballers from Hauts-de-France
Algerian people of Moroccan descent
Moroccan people of Algerian descent
French sportspeople of Moroccan descent
French sportspeople of Algerian descent
Living people
French footballers
Algerian footballers
Algeria youth international footballers
Moroccan footballers
Morocco youth international footballers
Association football midfielders
FC Sochaux-Montbéliard players
Paris 13 Atletico players
Ligue 2 players
Championnat National players
Championnat National 3 players